Sharples may refer to:

People
 Adam Sharples (born 1954), British executive
 Charlie Sharples (born 1989), English rugby union footballer
 Eliza Sharples (1805–1852), British writer and lecturer on freethought, radical politics and women's rights
 Ellen Sharples (1769–1849), English painter
 George Sharples (1943–2020), English footballer 
 James Sharples (disambiguation)
 Jeff Sharples (born 1967), Canada former National Hockey League player
 John Sharples (disambiguation)
 Katrina Sharples, New Zealand biostatistician and violist
 Kayla Sharples (born 1997), American soccer player
 Linda Sharples, British statistician
 Mike Sharples (born 1952), British academic
 Pamela Sharples, Baroness Sharples (1923–2022), wife of Richard Sharples
 Philip M. Sharples (1857–1944), American inventor and industrialist
 Pita Sharples (born 1941), Maori academic and politician
 Richard Sharples (1916–1973), British politician assassinated while Governor of Bermuda
 Robert Sharples (1913–1987), British musical conductor, composer and bandleader
 Robert Sharples (classicist) (1949–2010), English educator and authority on ancient Greek philosophy
 Rolinda Sharples (1793–1838), English painter
 Winston Sharples (1909–1978), American composer known for his work with animated shorts

Fictional characters
 Carrie Sharples, on the television series Alice
 Ena Sharples, on the British soap opera Coronation Street
 Mel Sharples, diner owner and cook in the film Alice Doesn't Live Here Anymore and the television series Alice

Places
 Sharples, Alberta, Canada, a ghost town
 Sharples, Greater Manchester, United Kingdom, a suburb of Bolton
 Sharples, West Virginia, United States, an unincorporated community

Other uses
 Sharples School, a co-educational secondary school in the Sharples area of Bolton in the English county of Greater Manchester

See also
 Sharples Separator Works, a factory complex in West Chester, Pennsylvania, United States, on the National Register of Historic Places